National Highway 183A, also known as NH 183A, is a National Highway in the Indian state of Kerala that runs from Chavara Titanium Junction, Kollam, to Vandiperiyar via Adoor and Pathanamthitta. It is the 4th National Highway passing through the Kollam district.

Elevation to National Highway
The road was declared a National Highway (NH) on 4 March 2014. It conforms to NH standards for a two-lane traffic highway from Adoor to Plapally. The section past Plapally is only 4 meters wide and passes through forest and wildlife areas. The Forest Department raised concerns over the road's alignment. Once upgraded, a new connection from Vandiperiyar to Sabarimala is planned.
Currently the stretch between Angamoozhy Forest Checkpost and Vallakadavu Forest Checkpost is entry restricted and the forest department allows only 30 private vehicles per day on the route and vehicles entering through Kochandi Check post has to leave only through Vallakkadavu Check post before 6 pm.

Major cities and linking towns
 Titanium Junction
 Sasthamkotta
 Sasthamkotta (Central Junction)
 Bharanikavu
 Kadampanad
 Adoor
 Nellimootil Padi Bridge Junction (NH 183A starts from MC Road) Adoor Bypass also starts here
 Adoor Central (junction with KP Road)
 Anandapaly (Thumpamon Road starts, a church is situated here)
 Thattayil
 Mankuzhi Keerukuzhy — Bhagavathikkum Padinjaru — Thumpamon road starts here
 Tholuzham a small junction in Thattayil, the famous Orippurathu bhagavathi temple is situated near this junction
 Kaipattoor
 Kaipattoor Thekke Kurishu: Ezhamkulam Road starts via Chandanapally, Kodumon
 Kaipattoor Kadav Jn (Konni Road starts via Vallikkode)
 Kaipattoor Central Jn. (Pandalam Road starts via Thumpamon)
Omalloor 
Omalloor bypass
 Pathanamthitta
 PTA Stadium Jn.: Ring road crosses
 Pathanamthitta – Intersects with Ring Road, TK Road
 Mylapra – Crosses Punaloor Moovattupuzha Main Eastern Hwy
 Mannarakulanji – Ranni Road deviates along Punaloor Moovattupuzha Main Eastern Hwy
 Vadasserikkera
Perunad
 Lahai
 Plappally
 Plappally – Pamba (Sabarimala Road), deviates to Angamoozhy
 Vandiperiyar
 Kakki Kavala – Joins NH 183 near Vandiperiyar

See also
 List of National Highways in India (by Highway Number)
 List of National Highways in India
 National Highways Development Project

References

External links

 Notification of NH 183A by NHAI
 Adoor Adimali Highway joining two National Highways ( NH183A and NH 155)
 Forest Department raises concerns over alignment of new Highway
 E Gazette Notification image

183A
National highways in India
Roads in Kollam district
Roads in Idukki district